Matthew Trott (born 9 June 1985 in Gosford, New South Wales, Australia) is an Australian professional goalkeeper.

Career
After having 31 consecutive games on the bench listed as a substitute in the A-League, Trott made his A-League debut for the Central Coast Mariners, appearing in the last game of the 2006–07 season. Since then, he has made infrequent appearances for the Mariners as a fill-in for regular goalkeeper Danny Vukovic. After he was released from the Mariners he went to England and signed with non-league club Didcot Town F.C.

Honours
With Central Coast Mariners:
 A-League Premiership: 2007–08
With Didcot Town FC:
 Southern Football League Division One South & West: 2008–09

External links
 Central Coast Mariners profile

1985 births
Living people
People from Gosford
Australian soccer players
A-League Men players
Central Coast Mariners FC players
Didcot Town F.C. players
Association football goalkeepers
Sportsmen from New South Wales
Soccer players from New South Wales